Tabanıyassı ("flat-footed") Mehmed Pasha (Born 1589- died 2 February 1637) was an Ottoman statesman of Albanian descent. He was governor of Egypt from September 1628 to October 1630. He served as Grand Vizier from 18 May 1632 to 1637 under Sultan Murat IV. During the early years of his term, he had the support of the sultan because of his services during the campaign in northwestern Iran (known as the Campaign of Revan). However, after sultan's return to Constantinople, Mehmed Pasha failed to defend the fort of Revan (modern Yerevan) against the Persian counterattack, and the sultan dismissed him from his post. In his later years, he was appointed as the governor of Silistra. In 1637, Murat IV became suspicious of Mehmed Pasha and accused him of attempting to start a rebellion in parts of the Empire. The sultan first imprisoned him at the Yedikule Fortress and then executed him by drowning on 2 February 1637.

Notes

1637 deaths
17th-century Grand Viziers of the Ottoman Empire
17th-century Ottoman governors of Egypt
17th-century executions by the Ottoman Empire
Ottoman governors of Egypt
Pashas
Albanian Grand Viziers of the Ottoman Empire
Albanians from the Ottoman Empire
Executed people from the Ottoman Empire
Executed Albanian people
Year of birth unknown
People executed by drowning